Clive Wedderburn (born 10 January 1967) is an English actor best known for his role as Police Constable Gary McCann in The Bill. 

He was born in Reading, Berkshire in 1967. In 1972 his parents moved to Birmingham, where he was to spend the next 13 years before moving to London to train as an actor at East 15 Acting School. He went on to enjoy a colourful acting career, performing on stage at the Royal National Theatre and the Royal Court Theatre. 

He acted in the short-lived Silver Street, a daily radio soap broadcast on BBC Asian Network.

Career
 The Bill
 Silent Witness: "Mind and Body" (2005) as Jack Harvey
Coronation Street

Also appeared in Saturday Disney as a detective with Carmen Ejogo.
 Garry McCann

References

External links

1967 births
Living people
People from Birmingham, West Midlands
British male soap opera actors